Peđa Krstin (born 3 September 1994) is a Serbian professional tennis player. Krstin has a career high ATP singles ranking of No. 159, which he achieved on 9 May 2016. He also achieved a career high ATP doubles ranking of No. 554 on 17 October 2015. He has won one Challenger and 14 Futures singles titles in his career.

Career
Krstin made his ATP main draw debut at 2014 PBZ Zagreb Indoors after defeating Marcos Baghdatis, Gianluigi Quinzi and Martin Fischer in the qualifying rounds before losing to compatriot Dušan Lajović in the first round of the main draw.

Krstin was a fifth player on a Serbian Davis Cup team in the first round tie against Croatia in the 2015 Davis Cup, but didn't play in any match. He finally played his first match for the Davis Cup team against United States in the first round of 2018 Davis Cup, defeating world No. 50 Steve Johnson in two sets in a dead rubber.

He received a wildcard for 2021 Serbia Open and won his first round match against Korean Kwon Soon-woo, who was ranked No. 89, almost 200 places higher than Krstin was at that moment. This was his first ATP tour-level victory in four main-draw appearances.

Grand Slam singles performance timeline

ATP Challenger Tour and ITF Futures finals

Singles: 27 (15 titles, 12 runner-ups)

Doubles: 3 (1 title, 2 runner-ups)

Notes

References

External links

1994 births
Sportspeople from Kikinda
Living people
Serbian male tennis players